The T27 Armored Car was a prototype armored car developed for the US Army in 1944 by the Studebaker Corporation. The T27 was an eight-wheeled vehicle, with the first, second and fourth pairs of wheels being powered. With a crew of four, the T27 was armed with two .30 caliber machine guns and a 37 mm cannon. Powered by a Cadillac gasoline eight-cylinder engine, two T27's were produced in 1944.

The T27's production was cancelled in favor of a competing design by Chevrolet, the T28 Armored Car.

Development
It was developed by the Studebaker Corporation in 1944 as a possible replacement for the M8 Greyhound. It was completed in late 1943 and was tested against the T28 Armored Car at the Aberdeen Proving Grounds. Although the T28 was found out to be more mobile than the T27, both were superior to the mobility of the M8. After more testing at Fort Riley, the T28 was found superior to the T27 and was officially designated the M38, but it was later cancelled because there was no apparent need for new armored cars after it finished testing.

Specifications 

Source:

See also 
 List of U.S. military vehicles by model number
 Military technology and equipment

References

Citations

Sources 

 
 
 

World War II armoured cars
World War II armored fighting vehicles of the United States
Abandoned military projects of the United States
Wheeled armoured fighting vehicles
Reconnaissance vehicles
Studebaker vehicles
Armoured cars of the United States